This article lists political parties in Kiribati. 
Kiribati has an informal party system, and the website of the House of Assembly of Kiribati says the following on the topic:
"The parties are loose groupings rather than disciplined blocks, with little or no structure. Members may change allegiance on a number of occasions during their tenure. It is also common for members to vote according to the special interests of their electorate on certain issues."

Current parties

Boutokaan Kiribati Moa Party (BKM), created in May 2020 by a merger of Pillars of Truth (Boutokaan te Koaua) and the Kiribati First Party (Kiribati Moa Party);
Tobwaan Kiribati Party (TKP), created by a merger between:
Maurin Kiribati Party
National Progressive Party
Protect the Maneaba (Maneaban Te Mauri)

Former parties
 Gilbertese National Party (1965), first party of the Gilbert and Ellice Islands colony;
  National Progressive Party created in the Gilbert Islands colony 
 United Coalition Party (2010-2016)

See also
 Politics of Kiribati
 List of political parties by country

References

 
Kiribati
Kiribati

political parties
Parties